Gor Mkhitarian (born in 1973 in Vanadzor, Armenia) is an Armenian singer and songwriter who started his musical career in Armenia. He immigrated to the United States and now is based in Los Angeles. In Armenia, he started with the rock formation Lav Eli. He developed his solo career starting in 2001 with a number of albums in various genres including pop, rock, and folk music. He sings both in English and Armenian.

Biography

In band Lav Eli

Gor was widely known throughout Armenia as the lead guitarist for one of country's best rock bands, Lav Eli (in Armenian Լավ էլի) that he established with fellow musician Mher Manukyan in 1996.

The original set-up was:
Mher Manukyan - vocals and guitar
Gor Mkhitaryan - guitar, backing vocals
Vahe Terteryan - bass
Davit Grigoryan - drums

Later on, with drummer David Grigoryan and bassist Vahe Terteryan leaving, the band was accentuated with more members, including a new bass player:
Tigran Voskanyan - bass
Bagrat Aznavouryan - guitar, backing vocals (2007-2019)
Gor Tadevosyan - guitar, backing vocals 
Shogher manukyan - cello
Vardan Paremuzyan - drums

Besides Lav Eli, Mkhitaryan also worked with the group Snack.

In Force Major project
Force Major (in Armenian Ֆօրս Մաժոր) was Mkhitarian's one-year experimental jam project established in 2000. Stylized as FORCE MAJOR, it was made up of:
Gor Mkhitarian - guitars, percussion
Vahe Terteryan - bass
Davit Grigoryan - drums
Shaun Hall - keyboard
Edgar Sargsyan - guitar

Guest musicians included Anush (flute), Diana (violin), Artyom (dhol), Aharon (guitar) and Mher Bekchyan (vocals). The project released a 5-track EP Force Major

Solo
Mkhitarian launched his solo career in 2001 with his debut solo album Yeraz and has released six more albums since: Godfather Tom (2003), Episode (2004), self-titled GOR (2006), Acoustic Folklore (2007), United Fantasies: Exit Ahead (2008) and Spirit (2009). Having been nominated for 14 industry music awards, he makes fresh and compelling music that successfully fuses traditional Armenian music with both rock and folk idioms.

In 2003, Mkhitarian moved to Los Angeles where drummer Andranik Harutyunyan, bassist Varoujan Hovakimyan, pianist Art Grigorian and guitarist Jay Dean joined the band. Stepping away from his previous acoustic-driven "signature", with the new band he features remarkable musicianship and showcases a different approach to his songwriting.

Gor Mkhitarian cites Simon & Garfunkel, Sting, and The Dave Matthews Band, to name a few, as strongly influencing his music. Traces of Armenian folk troubadours Ruben Hakhverdyan and Harout Bezjian as well as Bob Dylan can at times be heard in Mkhitarian's solo material.

Awards 

2007 Armenian Music Awards Winner—Best Alternative Folk Album ("Acoustic Folklore")
2006 Armenian Music Awards Nomination—Best Rock Album ("GOR")
2006 Armenian Music Awards Nomination—Best Music Video ("Stigma")
2005 Armenian Music Awards Winner—Best Music Video ("Wherever")
2005 Armenian Music Awards Nomination—Best Original Song ("Cold Wagon 1993")
2005 Armenian Music Awards Nomination—Best Folk-Rock Album ("Episode")
2004 Big Apple Music Awards Winner—Best Contemporary Singer ("Episode")
2004 Armenian Music Awards Nomination—Best Alternative Folk Album ("Godfather Tom")
2004 Armenian Music Awards Nomination—Best Album Cover-Design ("Godfather Tom")
2002 Armenian Music Awards Winner—Best Album Cover-Design ("Yeraz")
2002 Armenian Music Awards Nomination—Best Alternative Folk Album ("Yeraz")
2002 Armenian Music Awards Nomination—Best Newcomer (Gor Mkhitarian)
2002 Just Plain Folks Nomination—Best Ethnic/World Music Song ("Yeraz")
2002 Just Plain Folks Nomination—Best Ethnic/World Music Album ("Yeraz")

Discography

Albums
In Lav Eli
1995: Aha yev menk (in Armenian "Ահա և մենք") 
1996: First Lav Album (in Armenian "Առաջին ԼԱՎ Ալբոմ")
1999: Essays (in Armenian "Էսսեներ")
2006: Notes From Vanadzor – Urban Armenian Rock
Solo
2001: Yeraz (in Armenian "Երազ") 
2003: Godfather Tom (in Armenian "Կնքահայր Թոմ") 
2004: Episode
2006: GOR (in Armenian "Գոռ") 
2007: Acoustic Folklore
2008: United Fantasies: Exit Ahead
2009: Spirit (in Armenian "Հոգի")
2013: Live at Steve's Ranch 
2016: Passport

Videography
"Return" 
"Wherever" 
"STIGMA" 
"Inchu Bingyole Mtar" 
"Blessing" 
"About God" 
"Last Letter"

References

External links
Official website
Gor Mkhitarian at Armeniapedia
Gor Mkhitarian on Facebook
Gor Mkhitarian on MSN Music
Gor Mkhitarian on Myspace
Lav Eli website

1973 births
Armenian emigrants to the United States
21st-century Armenian male singers
Armenian rock musicians
Living people
People from Vanadzor
Singers from Los Angeles
21st-century American male singers
21st-century American singers